Captain Underpants and the Terrifying Return of Tippy Tinkletrousers is a 2012 American children's novel and the ninth book in the Captain Underpants series by Dav Pilkey. It was published on August 28, 2012, six years after the publication of the previous book. Tippy Tinkletrousers is actually Professor Poopypants, as revealed in the previous book. This book explains how Tippy Tinkletrousers arrived at the end of the eighth book, as well as a prequel story of George and Harold in kindergarten explaining how their friendship began and setting the page for their life before Captain Underpants.

Plot
In the last book just before George and Harold get arrested, Tippy Tinkletrousers appears in a time machine/pants robot, and freezes the two cops about to arrest them with a freeze ray built into the robot called the Freezy-Beam 4000. But Tippy was not supposed to be there and freeze the two cops, and he interrupted what was supposed to happen. What was supposed to happen was that George and Harold were arrested for the crimes that their cloned versions did, and the two (and Krupp) are imprisoned. At the Piqua State Penitentiary, Tippy is asked to build a statue (secretly a robot suit) of Warden Gordon Gordon Schmorden, the chief jailer of the prison. On the day Tippy presents his robot suit, he freezes everyone in his way, then takes Krupp to find the boys for Tippy. George and Harold snap their fingers bringing Captain Underpants to life, and soon, while trying to freeze him, Tippy accidentally freezes his robotic legs. Even though Captain Underpants successfully pulls off the top half of the robo-suit, Tippy escapes by going back in time exactly five years ago.

Five years ago, six year old Harold and his mother ago move in from Michigan and five-and-three-quarters-year-old George is forced by his mother to wear a tie as a good first impression. On his way to school, he notices six-year-old Harold being attacked by Kipper, Bugg, Loogie and Finkstein with the mean owner of the nearby gas station, Billy Bill, egging them on. Angered at this, George plays a smart prank on Billy Bill by changing his gas station's sign from "Free Brake Inspection" to "Free Bra Inspection", by removing k and e from the sign,  prompting a group of infuriated and offended women to attack the latter. George then saves Harold and the two become best friends. Mr. Krupp arrives and sends the two to detention for "bullying Kipper". To pass time, the two make their first comic: The Adventures of Dog Man.

George and Harold study Kipper for a week and then later switch his padlock for one of their own locks, and replace his stolen lunch money with girly things like friendship bracelets, dresses, dolls and Susie Sunshine bracelet kit's while sending strange texts to Kipper's goons, all while placing a note from "Wedgie Magee" with it. However, Kipper eventually catches on to the setup and, the next day, he and his gang steal the pizzas that George and Harold bought from Piqua Pizza Palace to the kindergartners as a way to torture them even further. Infuriated, the two friends come up with another major prank on the bullies in retaliation. First, they fill the four bullies' lockers with shaving cream to pass it off as ectoplasm. While initially, this works, Principal Krupp points out that the "ectoplasm" was obviously sprayed through the vents on doors. Enraged and tired of the anonymous pranks, Kipper and his three goons begin to torture the kindergarteners for answers, even stealing more pizzas, then charge money for leftovers. To retaliate, George and Harold ordered the next batch of pizzas to be 4 and each have double ghost chili peppers (Piqua Pizza Palace's hottest chili peppers) which cause the bullies' tongues to spice up completely, resulting in them getting sent to the nurse's office, holding an ice pack to their mouths. George and Harold eventually create a comic that tells the fictional tale of Wedgie Magee and the signs of his curse, all of which match their pranks. After Kipper and his gang "see" that ghost (George on stilts, wearing a giant pair of pants), they run outside in terror, during a severe thunderstorm and power outage. In the original timeline, they apologize for their deeds, compensate the kindergartners, and never bullied anyone as long as they lived. Then George and Harold call off the curse. Unfortunately, Tippy arrives in the past at exactly the same time Kipper's gang runs outside. The four bullies go insane from fear as Tippy's robot closely resembles the ghost of Wedgie Magee.

This causes the police to accuse Principal Krupp of causing Kipper and his friends' insanity. Despite the fact that no charges were pressed, everyone blamed him anyway, which eventually results in him permanently losing his job. Tippy then time travels four years back in the future, thinking that kids five years ago were weird. However, as Mr. Krupp was hypnotized to become Captain Underpants when George and Harold were in the 4th grade, a paradox happens, and a universe is created where Captain Underpants never existed. Tippy arrives in the present only to find out all that remains of Earth is a flaming and devastated wasteland (caused by Dr. Diaper's Laser-Matic 2000) and dominated by dead talking toilets and giant evil zombie nerds (because the boy whose mother thinks he talks crazy tells Tippy everything). Tippy realises that he has to go back again and save Earth. However, Tippy immediately presumably gets squashed by George and Harold, who are now giant zombie nerds (from the Rapid Evil Growth Juice). What remains left of Tippy is a red squishy stain, appearing to be blood.

Comics

The Adventures of Dog Man
One day, the cop and his specifically trained police dog Greg spot a bomb, but they are critically injured by its explosion and the doctor announces that Greg's body and the cop's head are dying. Fortunately, the nurse and doctor sews Greg's head on the Cop's body and everyone calls the hybrid "Dog Man." Dog Man catches criminals with his sensitive nose, hears crimes with his ears, and punches criminals with his fists. Petey, Rip Van Tinkle's former feline minion, sees Dog Man's weakness and invents an evil vacuum robot, which steals all the money from the bank and Dog Man comes to stop it, but the vacuum chases him until he is cornered. Dog Man is certain he will die but the vacuum robot unplugs and shuts down because the cord was about six inches short. Then he follows its cord to Petey's hideout and Dog Man arrests him.  The entire police force celebrates by drinking some alcohol-free wine.

The Curse of Wedgie Magee
The comic is about a boy called Wedgie Magee who is bullied up to the point where he can't bear it any longer. He visits a fortune teller who tells him she will concoct an anti-wedgie elixir. However, the fortune teller is short-sighted and grabs a ghost elixir by mistake. The next day, Wedgie rubs the elixir onto his trousers, turning his pants into a ghost. He then dies of embarrassment. That evening, the trousers return for revenge and swallow up the bullies.

Signs of the curse:
 The victim will begin to act weird
 The victim wants to play with dolls, dresses and bracelets
 The victim gets ectoplasm (ghost juice) and spiders on their belongings
 Food like pizza is very spicy to the victim
 The victim will feel a burning sensation in the armpits.

How to undo the curse:
The victim must undo their bad deeds and never pick on anybody ever again.

Characters (present)
 George Beard – A nine and three-quarters-year-old boy.
 Harold Hutchins – A ten-year-old boy.
 Mr. Krupp - The principal of Jerome Horwitz Elementary. In this book, he was arrested when the cops mistook him as Captain Blunderpants from Book 8 when the latter robbed a bank with George and Harold's evil counterparts.
 Captain Underpants – Mr. Krupp's alter-ego.
 Tippy Tinkletrousers – Formerly called Professor Poopypants, Tippy is a prisoner in Piqua State Penitentiary. He is building a giant Robo-Suit with a Freeze-Ray to escape out of prison, tricking the others that it's a statue by hiding his work under a tarp. When Tippy breaks out of prison, he carries Mr. Krupp, saying he knew him from the time he shrunk the school in Book 4. When Mr. Krupp turns into Captain Underpants, Tippy attempts to freeze him with his Freeze-Ray, but in the end, his feet get frozen and Captain Underpants rips off the top of the Robo-Suit. Tippy sets his Tinkle-Timer to 5 years ago but ends up scaring four 6th grade bullies, thinking his Robo-Trousers is the Haunted Pants of Wedgie Magee. The bullies then go crazy and Mr. Krupp gets fired for everything. Tippy then sets his Tinkle-Timer to 5 years later but is surprised to discover that because Captain Underpants is not around, the whole world is destroyed by moon rocks, Talking Toilets, and Giant Zombie Nerds.
 The Chief of Police – The leader of the cops.
 Officer McWiggly – Right-hand man of the chief.
 Warden Gordon Bordon Schmorden – The chief jailer of Piqua State Penitentiary.
 Director Hector Schmector - The administrator in Piqua Juvenile Detention Centre

Characters (past)
 George Beard – A five-and-three-quarters-year-old boy. He moved in from Michigan and makes friends with his next-door neighbor Harold Hutchins.
 Harold Hutchins – A six-year-old boy.
 Mr. Krupp – Kipper's uncle, who is the principal of Jerome Horwitz Elementary.
 Kipper Krupp – The captain of the sixth-grade wrestling team, school bully of the kindergartners, and nephew of Mr. Krupp.
 Finkstein, Bugg, and Loogie – Kipper's buddies from the wrestling team.
 Ladies – An angry mob of offended young, middle-aged, and elderly women who beat up Billy Bill as the result of a prank out of karma, courtesy of George. Two of them resemble Ms. Ribble and Miss Anthrope.
 Billy Bill – The less-than-friendly gas station owner who resembles Mr. Meaner.
 The cheerleaders – Wendy Swan is one of the cheerleaders. She and two others became frightened when they heard a ghost was haunting the school and ran away screaming after they saw a gooey substance coming out from the lockers that they thought was ectoplasm (but was actually shaving cream).
 Wedgie Magee – A kindergartner in the comic book.
 The four gossipy girls who are listened to by George.
 The delivery guy of the Piqua Pizza Palace.
 Ms. Ribble – The teacher of Jerome Horwitz Elementary School.
 Mr. Fyde – The former science teacher of Jerome Horwitz Elementary School and current resident (mentioned in the newspaper) of the Piqua Valley Home of the Reality Challenged.
 Donny Shoemyer – A kindergartner of Jerome Horwitz Elementary School and the first to suffer from Kipper's wrath upon him catching on to the ectoplasm  (shaving cream) prank.
 Freddie Moore – One of George and Harold's friends from kindergarten.
 Mr. and Mrs. Beard – George's parents.
 Mrs. Hutchins – Harold's mom.
 Mr. Hutchins – Harold's divorced father, who is currently moved to Nevada.

Reception
Reception for the book was mostly positive, with Kidsreads.com praising the entry. Booklist gave a positive review, writing that it would have a definite appeal to kids. Kirkus Reviews gave an ambivalent review, stating that the book's jokes were typical but that there were signs that the "creative wells are running dry at last".

Trivia 
 Crackers and Sulu are notably absent when George, Harold, and Mr. Krupp get arrested.

See also
Captain Underpants and the Preposterous Plight of the Purple Potty People
Captain Underpants and the Revolting Revenge of the Radioactive Robo-Boxers

References

External links
 Captain Underpants and the Terrifying Re-Turn of Tippy Tinkletrousers at Scholastic.com

Captain Underpants novels
2012 American novels
Organ transplantation in fiction
Brain transplantation in fiction
Novels about time travel
Scholastic Corporation books